William of Hesse-Philippsthal (born 29 August 1726 in Philippsthal; died: 8 August 1810, Philippsthal) was a member of the House of Hesse and Landgrave of Hesse-Philippsthal from 1770 until his death.

Life 
William was the eldest son of Landgrave Charles I of Hesse-Philippsthal from his marriage to Caroline Christine of Saxe-Eisenach (1699–1743), daughter of Duke John William III of Saxe-Eisenach.  He succeeded his father in 1770 as Landgrave of Hesse-Philippsthal.

William served in the Dutch army as General of the Cavalry and Governor of 's-Hertogenbosch.  William was also Komtur of the Knights Hospitallers of the Commandry of Łagów.

In 1806, the Landgraviate of Philippsthal was occupied by French troops and annexed to the short-lived Kingdom of Westphalia.  William died before his territory could be liberated from the French.

Marriage and issue 
William married on 22 June 1755 in Tournai his cousin Ulrika Eleonora (1732–1795), daughter of Landgrave William of Hesse-Philippsthal-Barchfeld, with whom he had the following children:
 Caroline (1756–1756)
 Charles (1757–1793), lieutenant colonel in the Guard Regiment of Hesse-Kassel
 married in 1791 princess Victoria of Anhalt-Bernburg (1772–1817), daughter of Prince Franz Adolph of Anhalt-Bernburg-Schaumburg-Hoym
 William (1758–1760)
 Frederick (1760–1761)
 Juliane (1761–1799)
 married in 1780 Count Philip Ernest of Schaumburg-Lippe (1723–1787)
 Frederick (1764–1794) Imperial lieutenant colonel in a Russian Guard Regiment Cuirassiers
 Louis (1766–1816), Landgrave of Hesse-Philippsthal
 married in 1791 Countess Marie Franziska Berghe von Trips (1771–1805), Mistress of the Robes at the court of Queen Maria Carolina
 William (1765–1766)
 Ernest Constantine (1771–1849), Landgrave of Hesse-Philippsthal
 married firstly in 1796 Princess Louise of Schwarzburg-Rudolstadt (1775–1808)
 married secondly in 1812 Princess Caroline of Hesse-Philippsthal (1793–1872)

Ancestors

References and sources 

 Carl Eduard Vehse: Geschichte der deutschen Höfe seit der Reformation, p. 319
 Georg Hassel:  Allg. Europäisches Staats u. Address…, p. 247

Landgraves of Hesse
18th-century German people
19th-century German people
House of Hesse
1726 births
1810 deaths